Neeson may refer to:

Brian Neeson, New Zealand politician
Cormac Neeson, lead singer of the Northern Irish hard rock band The Answer.
Doc Neeson, Australian rock singer
Jackie Neeson, Scottish footballer
Liam Neeson, Irish actor
Norm Neeson, Australian rules footballer
Patrick Neeson Lynch, Irish Roman Catholic bishop
Rachel Neeson, Australian architect and lecturer in architecture
Scott Neeson, Scottish-Australian film executive and philanthropist
Seán Neeson, Irish politician